The 2017 Northern Arizona Lumberjacks football team represented Northern Arizona University in the 2017 NCAA Division I FCS football season. They were led by 20th-year head coach Jerome Souers and played their home games at the Walkup Skydome. They were a member of the Big Sky Conference. They finished the season 7–5, 6–2 in Big Sky play to finish in a three-way tie for third place. They received an at-large bid into the FCS Playoffs where they were lost to San Diego in the first round.

Schedule

Source: Official Schedule

Game summaries

at Arizona

Western Illinois

at Cal Poly

Northern Colorado

Illinois State

at Portland State

UC Davis

Sacramento State

at Montana

Montana State

at Southern Utah

FCS Playoffs

San Diego–First Round

Ranking movements

References

Northern Arizona
Northern Arizona Lumberjacks football seasons
Northern Arizona
Northern Arizona Lumberjacks football